Ethnic Chinese in Brunei are people of full or partial Chineseparticularly Han Chineseancestry who are citizens or residents in Brunei. As of 2015, they constitute 10.1% of the country's population, making them the second largest ethnic group in Brunei. Brunei is home to one of the smaller communities of overseas Chinese. Many Chinese in Brunei are stateless.

Ethnic Chinese in Brunei were encouraged to settle because of their commercial and business acumen. The biggest Chinese group is the Hokkien; many originated from Kinmen and Xiamen in China. The Hakka and Cantonese represent a minority of the Chinese population. Despite their small numbers, the Hokkien have a considerable presence in Brunei's private and business sector, providing commercial and entrepreneurial expertise and often operating joint business ventures with Malaysian Chinese enterprises.

History
During the Song dynasty (960 AD to 1296 AD) trade was active between Poni (Brunei) and China. By the 17th century, Brunei had a Chinese community. However, trade declined in the 18th and 19th centuries. It was not until Brunei became a British protectorate that immigration increased again. Most of the immigrants arrived from Sarawak, Singapore and Hong Kong. In 1904, there were about 500 ethnic Chinese in Brunei, most of them British subjects. The discovery of oil in 1929 led to an increase in Chinese immigrants as many sought out the new employment opportunities related to this discovery of oil. The Chinese population continued to increase significantly during 1931–1947 when it quadrupled. In 1960, Ethnic Chinese made up slightly more than a quarter of the Bruneian population at 26%. The Chinese population of Brunei has declined significantly since then. Still, the Chinese population comprises 10.3% of the Bruneian population as of 2019, which places them as the second largest ethnic group in Brunei.

Statelessness
As of 1986, it was estimated that over 90% were unable to obtain Bruneian citizenship, despite generations of residence in the country. In recent years, ethnic Chinese in Brunei are allowed to obtain Bruneian Citizenship, however many encounter significant issues overcoming the Malay language exam which is a major requirement for gaining Bruneian citizenship. An overhaul of the Nationality Act has been blocked by the Home Ministry.

Religion 
Around 65% of the Chinese population in Brunei practices Buddhism and Taoism. An additional 20% practices Christianity. There are smaller numbers of Muslims, practitioners of other religions, and Irreligious individuals among the Chinese community in Brunei numbering a combined 15%.

Notable people
Ong Sum Ping married Princess Ratna Dewi, the daughter of Sultan Muhammad Shah of Brunei. He was conferred the nobility title of Pengiran Maharaja Lela and elected Chief of Kinabatangan in the 14th century.
Goh Kiat Chun (Wu Chun), actor and singer.  
Roderick Yong Yin Fatt, former Secretary-General of the Association of Southeast Asian Nations.
Lim Jock Seng, former Minister of Foreign Affairs and Trade II and Minister at the Prime Minister's Office.
Goh King Chin, former member of the Legislative Council of Brunei.
Jaspar Yu Woon Chai, badminton player, Bruneian representative at the 2016 Summer Olympics.
Lim Jock Hoi, 14th Secretary General of ASEAN.
Lau Ah Kok, owner of Hua Ho.
Amin Liew Abdullah, Minister of Finance and Economy II and Minister at the Prime Minister's Office.
Cornelius Sim, first Roman Catholic Vicar Apostolic of Brunei and first Cardinal of Brunei and Borneo.
Steven Chong Wan Oon, current Chief Justice of the Supreme Court of Brunei.
Ong Tiong Oh, member of the Legislative Council of Brunei and Chairman of the Board of Directors at Chung Hwa Middle School.
Andrew Shie, first Bruneian elevated as Assistant Bishop in the Anglican Diocese of Kuching (Sarawak and Brunei).

See also
 Malaysian Chinese
Singaporean Chinese
 Indonesian Chinese
 Filipino Chinese
Thai Chinese
Vietnamese Chinese
Cambodian Chinese
Laotian Chinese
East Timorese Chinese
Burmese Chinese
Chinese folk religion in Southeast Asia
 Brunei–China relations

References

 
Ethnic groups in Brunei